The Swift–Hohenberg equation (named after Jack B. Swift and Pierre Hohenberg) is a partial differential equation noted for its pattern-forming behaviour. It takes the form

where u = u(x, t) or u = u(x, y, t) is a scalar function defined on the line or the plane, r is a real bifurcation parameter, and N(u) is some smooth nonlinearity.

The equation is named after the authors of the paper, where it was derived from the equations for thermal convection.

The webpage of Michael Cross contains some numerical integrators which demonstrate the behaviour of several Swift–Hohenberg-like systems.

References

Partial differential equations